Kelsey was a provincial electoral district  for the Legislative Assembly of the province of Saskatchewan, Canada, encompassing the towns of Hudson Bay and Carrot River. The district was named after 17th century explorer Henry Kelsey.

Created before the 12th Saskatchewan general election in 1952, this riding was combined with part of the Melfort-Tisdale district (as "Tisdale-Kelsey") before the 17th Saskatchewan general election in 1971. It is now part of the constituency of Carrot River Valley.

Members of the Legislative Assembly

Election results

|-
 
|style="width: 130px"|CCF
|John Hewgill Brockelbank
|align="right"|4,188
|align="right"|53.44%
|align="right"|–

|- bgcolor="white"
!align="left" colspan=3|Total
!align="right"|7,837
!align="right"|100.00%
!align="right"|

|-
 
|style="width: 130px"|CCF
|John Hewgill Brockelbank
|align="right"|3,189
|align="right"|44.41%
|align="right"|-9.03

|- bgcolor="white"
!align="left" colspan=3|Total
!align="right"|7,181
!align="right"|100.00%
!align="right"|

|-
 
|style="width: 130px"|CCF
|John Hewgill Brockelbank
|align="right"|2,736
|align="right"|41.19%
|align="right"|-3.22

 
|Prog. Conservative
|Allan Oliver Anderson
|align="right"|878
|align="right"|13.22%
|align="right"|–
|- bgcolor="white"
!align="left" colspan=3|Total
!align="right"|6,643
!align="right"|100.00%
!align="right"|

|-
 
|style="width: 130px"|CCF
|John Hewgill Brockelbank
|align="right"|2,561
|align="right"|39.00%
|align="right"|-2.19

 
|Prog. Conservative
|Carsten Johnson
|align="right"|1,488
|align="right"|22.66%
|align="right"|+9.44
|- bgcolor="white"
!align="left" colspan=3|Total
!align="right"|6,567
!align="right"|100.00%
!align="right"|

|-
 
|style="width: 130px"|NDP
|John Rissler Messer
|align="right"|2,473
|align="right"|45.29%
|align="right"|+6.29

 
|Prog. Conservative
|Carsten Johnson
|align="right"|606
|align="right"|11.10%
|align="right"|-11.56
|- bgcolor="white"
!align="left" colspan=3|Total
!align="right"|5,460
!align="right"|100.00%
!align="right"|

See also
Electoral district (Canada)
List of Saskatchewan provincial electoral districts
List of Saskatchewan general elections
List of political parties in Saskatchewan
Hudson Bay, Saskatchewan
Carrot River, Saskatchewan

References
 Saskatchewan Archives Board – Saskatchewan Election Results By Electoral Division

Former provincial electoral districts of Saskatchewan